"For First Time Lovers" (Hangul: 처음 사랑하는 연인들을 위해, subtitled Banmal Song [반말송]) is Jung Yong-hwa's first solo digital single which was released on 14 January 2011. The song was featured on the second season of We Got Married, where Yonghwa was in a virtual marriage with Girls' Generation's Seohyun, who he wrote the song for.

Background
In an episode of We Got Married where Yonghwa and Girls' Generation's Seohyun were a virtual couple, Yonghwa revealed to his virtual wife that he was working on a song about her. 'Banmal' is the informal form of speech in the Korean language. Seohyun is known to have difficulty dropping honorifics with those who are older than her, and the song is inspired by Yonghwa's desire to hear her speak to him in 'Banmal'.

The song was released as a single on 14 January 2011 and upon its release, topped various South Korean music charts such as Bugs, Daum, Soribada and Naver Music. The song debuted at #12 on the Gaon Singles Chart, climbing up to the #1 spot in the following week and stayed there for two consecutive weeks.

Music video
In the 64th episode of the second season of We Got Married, the virtual couple 'YongSeo' (a portmanteau of the couple's names) were given a mission to record and upload a music video of the song on YouTube. The two filmed it in the living room of their house in the show, with both of them playing guitars as they performed it.

Track listing

 The Banmal Song UCC was chosen as number 4 out of the top 10 UCCs of the first half-year of 2011 by YouTube Korea.

References

2011 singles
2011 songs
Jung Yong-hwa songs
Songs written by Jung Yong-hwa
We Got Married
Gaon Digital Chart number-one singles